Walnut Township is one of thirteen townships in Fremont County, Iowa, United States.  As of the 2010 census, its population was 145 and it contained 66 housing units.

Geography

Transportation
 Iowa Highway 2

School districts
 Farragut Community School District
 Shenandoah Community School District

Political districts
 Iowa's 3rd congressional district
 State House District 23
 State Senate District 12

References

External links
 City-Data.com

Townships in Iowa
Townships in Fremont County, Iowa